The 2016 Kentucky Derby was the 142nd running of the Kentucky Derby. 
The race was run at 6:51 pm Eastern Daylight Time (EDT) on May 7, 2016 at Churchill Downs. The race was broadcast in the United States on the NBC television network. The second largest attendance of 167,227 was on hand for the event.

Qualification

The Kentucky Derby is a race for 3-year-old Thoroughbred horses. The 2016 field was determined by the Road to the Kentucky Derby points system that was first introduced in 2013.

Field
The Post Position Draw of the entries for the Kentucky Derby was held Wednesday, May 4, 2016 at the Churchill Downs Racetrack clubhouse. After the draw was made, the undefeated Nyquist was installed as the 3–1 morning line favorite.  In spite of having been undefeated in his seven previous races and having already defeated several of the other entries, including second-favorite Exaggerator, Nyquist was viewed as vulnerable, in part because of the statistical improbability of the race favorite winning for four years in a row. Pundits also noted the unusual number of gray horses in the field, four in total and three of them sons of Tapit, a gray stallion who is ranked as the leading sire in America.

Race description

At the start, Danzing Candy quickly took the lead and held onto it for  until fading. The favorite, Nyquist, broke well and stayed close to the leaders, no farther back than third throughout the race. At the top of the stretch, Gun Runner, who had been running second or third throughout, briefly took the lead but was quickly surpassed by Nyquist. Exaggerator, who had started well back in 15th place, closed fast at the end. Nyquist held him off to win the race by  lengths. Nyquist was the eighth undefeated winner in Kentucky Derby history, the first since Big Brown in 2008.  The last horse to have been undefeated in seven races prior to winning the Derby was Majestic Prince in 1969.

Results

Track – Fast

Times:  mile – 0:22.58;   mile – 0:45.72;  mile – 1:10.40; mile – 1:36.51;  final – 2:01.31.
Splits for each quarter-mile: (:22.58) (:23.14) (:24.68) (:25.21) (:25.70)

Source: Equibase chart

Payout
The Kentucky Derby Payout Schedule

 $2 Exacta: (13–11) $30.80
 $1 Trifecta: (13–11–5)  $86.70
 $1 Superfecta: (13–11–5–14) $542.10
 $1 Super Hi 5 (Pentafecta): (13–11–5–14–2) $5,794.50

Subsequent Grade I wins 

Although Nyquist never won another race, several other horses from the Derby went on to win at the Grade I level:
 Exaggerator – Preakness Stakes, Haskell Invitational
 Gun Runner – Clark Handicap, 2017 Stephen Foster Handicap, Whitney Stakes, Woodward Stakes, Breeders' Cup Classic, 2018 Pegasus World Cup
 Mor Spirit – 2017 Metropolitan Handicap
 Creator – Belmont Stakes
 Whitmore – 2018 Forego Stakes, 2020 Breeders' Cup Sprint

References

2016 in horse racing
Derby
2016
May 2016 sports events in the United States